Ante Blažević (born 5 May 1996) is a Croatian professional footballer who plays as a right-back for Bulgarian First League club Levski Sofia. On 9 July 2022, he made his official debut for Levski Sofia in the 0:1 loss against CSKA 1948, which was the team's first league match for the 2022-23 season, but after that fell out of favor with coach Stanimir Stoilov and was removed from the first team.

References

External links
Ante Blažević at Sofascore

1996 births
Living people
Footballers from Split, Croatia
Association football fullbacks
Croatian footballers
Croatia youth international footballers
K.V. Oostende players
NK Junak Sinj players
VfV 06 Hildesheim players
NK Brežice 1919 players
NK Čelik Zenica players
FK Željezničar Sarajevo players
PFC Levski Sofia players
Belgian Pro League players
Second Football League (Croatia) players
Regionalliga players
Slovenian Second League players
Premier League of Bosnia and Herzegovina players
First Professional Football League (Bulgaria) players
Croatian expatriate footballers
Croatian expatriate sportspeople in Belgium
Croatian expatriate sportspeople in Germany
Croatian expatriate sportspeople in Slovenia
Croatian expatriate sportspeople in Bosnia and Herzegovina
Croatian expatriate sportspeople in Bulgaria
Expatriate footballers in Belgium
Expatriate footballers in Germany
Expatriate footballers in Slovenia
Expatriate footballers in Bosnia and Herzegovina
Expatriate footballers in Bulgaria